The Williams News was founded in Williams, Arizona in July 1891, by a group of men which included A. R. Kilgore, a local sheep rancher.  It was recognized as the official paper of both Williams, and Coconino County.  In 1892 J. F. Michael took over editing and publishing responsibilities, and held them through 1893.  In 1901 the paper was being run by George U. Young and Charles A. Neal, and in 1906 Frank L. Moore purchased the paper for $3,000.  He ran the paper for 7 years, until selling it in 1913 to Frank E. Wells for $2,500.  Wells ran the paper until his death in 1965, after which his son, F. Evart Wells took over the business.  Doug Wells, Evart's son and Frank's grandson, took over editing paper in 1978 upon the death of his father.  The paper remained in circulation through 1989 when it was succeeded by the Williams-Grand Canyon-News, which is still being published.  While almost always in English, from April 1, 1927, until February 3, 1928, there were several sections in the paper printed in Spanish, including “Nuevas en Espanol,” “Pagina en Espanol,” “Glosario de la semana,”, and “Seccion en Espanol.

References

Newspapers published in Arizona
Publications established in 1891
Weekly newspapers published in the United States
Publications disestablished in 1989
1891 establishments in Arizona Territory
1989 disestablishments in Arizona